Sofyan El Gadi (born 1 January 1992 in Tripoli, Libya) is Libyan swimmer. He competed in the 100 m butterfly event at the 2012 Summer Olympics. He was the flag bearer of Libya at the opening ceremony.

References

External links
 

1992 births
Living people
Swimmers at the 2008 Summer Olympics
Swimmers at the 2012 Summer Olympics
Olympic swimmers of Libya
Libyan male swimmers
People from Tripoli, Libya
Swimmers at the 2013 Mediterranean Games
Male butterfly swimmers
Mediterranean Games competitors for Libya